The Laughing Place is a traditional African American folktale, featuring Br'er Rabbit, Br'er Fox and Br'er Bear. It is famous for its inclusion among Joel Chandler Harris' Uncle Remus stories.

Summary
Following Br'er Rabbit's capture, the hero leads his captors, wily Br'er Fox and dim-witted Br'er Bear, to his "laughin' place". Out of curiosity, they let him lead the way, only for Br'er Rabbit to walk them straight into a cavern of bees. While the antagonists are stung, Br'er Rabbit escapes.

This story can be traced to African trickster tales, particularly the hare that figures prominently in the storytelling traditions in Western Africa, Central Africa, and Southern Africa. In the Akan traditions of West Africa, the trickster is usually the spider (see Anansi), though the plots of tales of the spider are often identical with those of stories of Br'er Rabbit.

In popular culture
The story was used in the 1946 film Song of the South along with "The Tar Baby" and "The Briar Patch". It is also referenced in a dark ride scene of Splash Mountain, a log flume-style attraction based on Song of the South at Disneyland, Tokyo Disneyland and formerly at Magic Kingdom in Orlando.

The term "The Laughing Place" is also used in the Stephen King novel Misery and the second season of the series Castle Rock.

References

African-American cultural history
Br'er Rabbit
Rabbits and hares in literature
Bears in literature
Literature featuring anthropomorphic foxes
Folklore of the Southern United States